The 2016–17 Calgary Flames season was their 37th season in Calgary, and the 45th season for the National Hockey League franchise that was established on June 6, 1972.

Off-season
After a season of high expectations from the 2014–15 season for the Flames, those results did not carry over into the 2015–16 season. The team finished with only 77 points and failed to qualify for the 2016 NHL Playoffs. To start with, Bob Hartley was let go, and Glen Gulutzan was brought in as the new coach. The biggest question the Flames faced in the off-season was acquiring a proven number one goalie. Jonas Hiller, Karri Ramo, and Joni Ortio all combined for a save percentage of .892 and goals against of 3.13, an NHL-worst in the 2015–16 season. General manager Brad Treliving addressed this need by acquiring veteran Brian Elliott on June 24, 2016, in a deal on the sidelines of the 2016 NHL Entry Draft. On the draft's opening day the Flames got top prospect Matthew Tkachuk as the 6th overall pick of the Draft. On July 1, 2016, the Flames made significant acquisitions by signing power forward Troy Brouwer and journeyman goaltender Chad Johnson. Several other players such as Alex Chiasson and Linden Vey were also brought in. The next biggest task Treliving faced was signing rising stars Johnny Gaudreau and Sean Monahan to contracts. On August 19, 2016, Monahan and the Flames agreed to a 7-year deal worth $44.625 million.  On October 10, 2016, two days before the start of the regular season, Gaudreau and the Flames agreed to a 6-year deal worth $40.5 million. Gaudreau was tied with defenceman and captain Mark Giordano as the highest-paid Flames player.

Regular season

October – December 
The Flames open their season with their first two losses 7-4 and 5-3 to their provincial rival Edmonton Oilers. The team was expected to have an improved save percentage with Brian Eliott. However, they had a rough time with their No. 1 goaltender Brian Elliott which led them being placed outside of playoff picture promoting them to switch to their backup goaltender Chad Johnson. Chad Johnson was proved to be a better goaltender than Brian Eliott for about a month. They had a six-game winning streak from November 30 to December 14 which elevated them back into playoff position. After their six-game winning streak ended with a 6-3 loss to Tampa Bay Lightning 6-3, the starting goaltender position slowly shifted back to Brian Elliott.

January – April 
The Flames continued to maintain their position in the playoff spot. They struggled the rest of the month, but they continued to keep pace in the conference standings. Even on February 25, 2017, the Flames still held the first wildcard spot in the Western Conference.

With their win over the New York Islanders on March 5, the Flames surpassed their total number of wins – 35 – of the 2015–16 season.

With their win over the Winnipeg Jets on March 11, the Flames surpassed their franchise-long winning streak while based in the city of Calgary, at 9 consecutive games. Goalie Brian Elliott also recorded his second shutout in a row. The Flames tied their all-time franchise winning streak of 10 games with a shootout win over the Pittsburgh Penguins on March 13. The Atlanta Flames won 10 straight from October 14 to November 3, 1978. The streak would end with their next game on March 15, being outscored by the Boston Bruins 5–2. Though Chad Johnson started in net due to Brian Elliott waking up that morning with the flu, coach Glen Gulutzan told reporters that no individual player was responsible for the loss to the Bruins and the end of the streak.

On March 20, Brian Elliott was named the NHL's 3rd Star of the Week for the week of March 20 to the 26th. From February 20 – March 20, Elliott recorded a career-best winning streak of 11 games, featuring back-to-back shutouts on March 9 and 11. In addition during the streak, Elliott also tied the longest winning streak for a Flames game-starting goalie, an 11-game record set by the legendary Mike Vernon from January 17 to February 27, 1989.

Forward Matthew Tkachuk was suspended by the NHL for two games (on March 21 and March 23) due to Tkachuk's elbow purposely hitting the head of the L.A. Kings' Drew Doughty in the Flames' win on March 19.

In the Flames' 3–2 win over the St. Louis Blues on March 25, centreman and alternate captain Sean Monahan broke Jarome Iginla's franchise regular-season overtime winning goal record with Monahan's seventh career regular-season 5-minute overtime period goal.

With a win against the San Jose Sharks on March 31, the Flames clinched a playoff berth, their first postseason appearance since the 2014–15 season and only their second playoff appearance in the last eight seasons.

Standings

Schedule and results

Pre-season

Regular season

Playoffs

Player statistics

Skaters

Goaltenders

†Denotes player spent time with another organization before joining Flames. Stats reflect time with the Flames only.
‡Traded mid-season. Stats reflect time with the Flames only.

Awards and honours

Awards

Milestones

Records

Transactions

Trades

Free agents acquired

Free agents lost

Claimed via waivers

Lost via waivers

Player signings

Draft picks

Below are the Calgary Flames' selections at the 2016 NHL Entry Draft, held on June 24–25, 2016, at the First Niagara Center in Buffalo.

 The Calgary Flames' second-round pick went to the St. Louis Blues as the result of a trade on June 24, 2016, that sent Brian Elliott to Calgary in exchange for a conditional third-round pick in 2018 and this pick.
 The Florida Panthers' second-round pick went to the Calgary Flames as the result of a trade on February 27, 2016, that sent Jiri Hudler to Florida in exchange for a fourth-round pick in 2018 and this pick.
 The Dallas Stars' second-round pick went the Calgary Flames as the result of a trade on February 29, 2016, that sent Kris Russell to Dallas in exchange for Jyrki Jokipakka, Brett Pollock and this pick (being conditional at time of the trade). The condition – Calgary will receive a second-round pick in 2016 if Dallas fails to qualify for the 2016 Western Conference Final – was converted on May 11, 2016.
 The Minnesota Wild's sixth-round pick went to the Calgary Flames as the result of a trade on February 29, 2016, that sent David Jones to Minnesota in exchange for Niklas Backstrom and this pick.

References

Calgary Flames seasons
Calgary Flames
Calgary